Edmund "Adam" Adamkiewicz (21 April 1920 in Hamburg – 4 April 1991) was a German footballer.

Adamkiewicz's career began in Wilhelmsburg, where he played for Viktoria Wilhelmsburg, and led him to various clubs, his first spell with Hamburger SV starting in early 1940. Both of his international appearances were during World War II. On 22 November 1942, Adamkiewicz scored his only international goal.

After the war finished, Adamkiewicz played for Eintracht Frankfurt during the 1946–47 season and played 21 times. In 1947 he returned to Hamburg where he became top-scorer for two non-consecutive seasons, before moving on in 1951. He was with VfB Mühlburg/Karlsruher SC for a time before returning to Hamburg once again where he joined Harburger TB.

References

External links
 

1920 births
1991 deaths
German people of Polish descent
Footballers from Hamburg
German footballers
Association football forwards
Germany international footballers
Altonaer FC von 1893 players
Hamburger SV players
Eintracht Frankfurt players
Karlsruher SC players